Real Estelí Baloncesto is a Nicaraguan basketball team based in Estelí. Founded in 2018, it is the basketball section of the Real Estelí FC football club, which was founded in 1959. The team entered the Liga Superior de Baloncesto (LSB) for its debut season in 2018 season. 

Real Estelí's home arena is the Alexis Arguello Sports Complex, which was opened in 2017 and has a capacity of 8,057 people.

History
The first game of the team in the LSB was played on 9 February 2018 against Leones de Managua.

In 2019, head coach David Rosario took over the team. Before he joined Estelí, Rosario had been the three-time Baloncesto Superior Nacional champion with Capitanes de Arecibo.  In the same year, Real Estelí played in the inaugural season of the newly founded, Basketball Champions League Americas. Real reached the quarterfinals. A year later, the team won its first LSB championship after defeating Brumas de Jinotega in the playoff finals.

In April 2021, Real Estelí played in the Final Eight of the 2020–21 BCL Americas and hosted the tournament in Managua. The team managed to reach the final for the first time in club history, where it narrowly lost to Flamengo 80–84.

Real Estelí qualified for the 2021–22 BCL Americas season, which was its fourth in a row. El Tren del Norte was allotted into Group A alongside Cangrejeros de Santurce and the Edmonton Stingers.

On 3 December 2021, the club repeated as LSB champions after beating Brunas de Jinotega in the final.

Honours

National
Liga Superior de Baloncesto
Champions (4): 2019, 2020, 2021, 2022
Carlos Ulloa Tournament
Champions (1): 2022

International
BCL Americas
Runner-up (1): 2020–21
Liga Centroamericana
Winners (1): 2018

Players

Current roster

In international competitions
 Champions   Runners-up   Third place   Fourth place

BCL Americas 
Below are all the seasons of Real Estelí in the BCL Americas competition.

Notable players
- Set a club record or won an individual award as a professional player.
- Played at least one official international match for his senior national team at any time.

  Farrell Pauth
  Andy Perez
  Jared Ruiz
  Thomas Vansdell
  Jaison Valdez
  Delroy James
  Renaldo Balkman
  Alex Franklin
  De Jesús Jezreel
  Javier Mojica
  Christian Pizarro
  Melsahn Basabe
  JC Fuller

References

External links
REAL ESTELI profile - Champions League Americas
Real Estelí Baloncesto on Twitter

Estelí
Basketball teams in Nicaragua
Basketball teams established in 2018
2018 establishments in Nicaragua